The parotid fascia in human anatomy is a fascia that builds a closed membrane together with the masseteric fascia. This common membrane sheaths the parotid gland, its excretory duct and the passing out branches of the facial nerve as well. The parotid fascia proceeds of the superficial layer of the deep cervical fascia that splits to cover the gland. At the lateral side of the gland this fascia is called the parotid fascia. The fascia itself is made of two layers: A superficial layer (lat. Lamina superficalis) that passes cranial into the temporal fascia and lateral into the masseteric fascia, and a deeper layer (lat. Lamina profunda) that covers the Stylohyoid muscle, the styloglossus and the Musculus stylopharyngeus. The superficial layer is attached to the zygomatic arch above and to the mandible below.

The fascia sends many septae that passes among the lobules of glandular tissue. With increasing weight the fascia exhibits greater splitting.

References 

 
 

Fascial spaces of the head and neck